The 2014 Ligas Superiores, the fifth division of Peruvian football (soccer), was played by variable number teams by Departament. The tournaments was played on a home-and-away round-robin basis.

Liga Superior del Callao

Serie A

Serie B

Liga Superior de Lambayeque

Liga Superior de Piura

Serie A

Serie B

Semifinals

Liga Superior de Tumbes

Serie A

Serie B

Cuadragunlar Final

External links
 DeChalaca.com - copaperu.pe la información más completa del "fútbol macho" en todo el Perú

2014
5